The Colgate-Hong Kong Open was a golf tournament on the LPGA Tour played only in 1976. It was played at the Royal Hong Kong Golf Club in Hong Kong. Judy Rankin won the event by one stroke over Hisako "Chako" Higuchi.

References

Former LPGA Tour events
Golf tournaments in Hong Kong
1976 establishments in Hong Kong
1976 disestablishments in Hong Kong